Edward Wesley Hildreth III, (usually known as Wes Hildreth) is an American field geologist and volcanologist with the United States Geological Survey (USGS). He is a Fellow of both the Geological Society of America, and the American Geophysical Union. Hildreth was described as "one of the great volcanologists/petrologists of our time" by the magazine Wired.

Biography 
Hildreth was born in 1938 in Newton, Massachusetts. He grew up 'bi-coastal', both in the Boston area and in the Bay area, in Marin County. He spent his first two years of school in Belvedere, California, years three through ten in Massachusetts, and years ten through twelve in Mill Valley, California. Hildreth went to Harvard University, taking some time out between his sophomore and junior years to train with an army reserve unit. In 1961, Hildreth graduated with B.A. in geology. He participated in cross country for the Harvard Crimson while he attended Harvard. 

For the next few years after graduating, Hildreth travelled the world, and worked for some time as a Naturalist for the National Park Service and an Instructor at University of California, Berkeley. Later, Hildreth went to grad school at University of California, Berkeley, and in 1977 completed a Ph.D. under the supervision of Ian S. E. Carmichael. He began working for the USGS as a research geologist in 1977, straight after completing his thesis.

Relationships

Gail Mahood 
Hildreth is married to Gail Mahood, a geology professor at Stanford University, whom he has published multiple research papers with.

Work 
Much of his work has been in the fields of petrologyand volcanology. He has made significant contributions to field volcanology, and the study of large volcanic caldera systems and large and chemically-zoned silicic eruptions.   

While at University of California, Berkeley, he was a student of Garniss Curtis.

Hildreth has worked closely with fellow geologist Dave Tucker on geological research in the North Cascades. Hildreth has also worked with other notable geologists, including Suzanne Mahlburg Kay, David A. Johnston, Mark S. Ghiorso; Charles R. Bacon; and Penrose Medal winner James Gregory Moore.

Hildreth has published works about geology from many regions around the world, including Redoubt and Kaguyak, Alaska; Death Valley, California; Yellowstone, Wyoming; multiple locations in Washington and Oregon, and in the Andes of Chile.

While he worked for the National Park Service, he wrote reports about Muir Woods in California.

Hildreth participated in the 2005 GSA Field Forum in the Sierra Nevada and White-Inyo Mountains, California, as well as the 2009 GSA Field Forum in Bishop, California, which culminated in a special issue in the journal Lithosphere. Hildreth, along with his main research partner Judy Fierstein, hosted a community interpretive walk at Devils Postpile in July 2016.

Geologic research 
Some of Hildreth's most notable research has been on the Long Valley caldera and the associated Bishop Tuff. His work developed a scientific working hypothesis on the origins of the formations. 

Hildreth also authored a USGS publication covering the 1912 eruption of Novarupta 100 years after the eruption; the centennial of which was noted in multiple publications, including Wired, Discover, and The Associated Press.

Awards 
Hildreth has received many awards and honors in recognition of his contributions to research in volcanology and petrology. Notable awards include
 1983-85: G.K. Gilbert Fellowship (USGS)
 1985: N.L. Bowen Award (AGU)
 2004: Thorarinsson Medal (IAVCEI)
 2004: Meritorious Service Award (DOI)
 2006: Outstanding Publication Award (Association of Earth Science Editors)
 2019: Florence Bascom Geologic Mapping Award (GSA)

 Fellow (GSA)
 Fellow (AGU)

Other 

 1959: Outstanding Soldier of the Cycle (US Army)
 1960: Boston Marathon, 29th place

Professional service 
Hildreth has served on many editorial boards, and on committees of academic societies, including the 
editorial board of the Bulletin of Volcanology, 1991-2001; as Associate Editor of the Journal of Geophysical Research (1984-1986) and Andean Geology (1987-present); and as publications reviewer for the USGS (1996-2013). He sat on the AGU Fellows Selection Committee (2008-2012), and the IAVCEI Honors and Awards Committee, (2012-15)

Bibliography 
Hildreth has published numerous books and papers over his career, even being listed on Scopus as having over nine thousand citations. He is also briefly mentioned in the book A to Z of Earth Scientists.

References

External Links 
Find publications via:
 Wes Hildreth on Google Scholar
 Wes Hildreth on ScienceBase-Catalog
 Wes Hildreth on GSA Bulletin

Living people
1938 births
American geologists
Harvard College alumni
University of California, Berkeley alumni
United States Geological Survey personnel
American volcanologists
American earth scientists
Scientists from California
Scientists from the San Francisco Bay Area
Academics from California
Fellows of the American Geophysical Union
Fellows of the Geological Society of America
People from Newton, Massachusetts